Secret of Mary is a book by Saint Louis de Montfort on the Roman Catholic theme of devotion to the Blessed Virgin Mary.

Description
The book is published by Tan Books but is also available free online. It complements de Montfort's other books, Secret of the Rosary and True Devotion to Mary.

Saint Louis de Montfort's books attracted attention in the 20th century when in an address to the Montfortian Fathers, Pope John Paul II said that reading one of de Montfort's books had been a "decisive turning point" in his life.

See also
Saint Louis de Montfort
Company of Mary
Daughters of Wisdom

References

Catholic Mariology
Catholic devotions
Christian devotional literature
Christian literature
18th-century books
Books about Christianity
Marian devotions